Felipe Araya Urrutia (born 14 December 1990) is a Chilean footballer who plays as striker.

External links
 
 

1990 births
Living people
Chilean footballers
Cobresal footballers
Coquimbo Unido footballers
Curicó Unido footballers
Deportes Linares footballers
Independiente de Cauquenes footballers
Chilean Primera División players
Segunda División Profesional de Chile players
Primera B de Chile players
Association football forwards